Passo Frontè (2081 m) is a mountain pass in the Province of Imperia (Italy).  It connects Montegrosso Pian Latte, located in the Arroscia Valley, with Monesi di Triora (Tanaro Valley).

Geography 
Passo Frontè is located on the main chain of the Alps between Monte Frontè (2152 m) and cima Garlenda (2041 m). Near the pass there are some ruins of an old barrak.

Hiking 

The pass is accessible by off-road mountain paths coming from the nearby valleys and is crossed by the Alta Via dei Monti Liguri, a long-distance trail from Ventimiglia (province of Imperia) to Bolano (province of La Spezia).

During snowy winters the pass can also be reached with snowshoes.

Mountain huts 
 Rifugio Sanremo (2,054 m)

See also

 List of mountain passes
 Passo Garlenda

References

Fronte
Fronte